Thierry Goudet (born 11 November 1962 in Château-Gontier, France) is a football coach and former player who played as a midfielder and most recently managed Laval.

References

External links
 
 Player profile
 

Living people
1962 births
People from Château-Gontier
Sportspeople from Mayenne
French footballers
Association football midfielders
Stade Lavallois players
Stade Brestois 29 players
Stade Rennais F.C. players
Le Havre AC players
Ligue 1 players
Ligue 2 players
French football managers
Le Mans FC managers
Grenoble Foot 38 managers
Stade Brestois 29 managers
US Créteil-Lusitanos managers
Stade Lavallois managers
Ligue 1 managers
Footballers from Pays de la Loire